The Bacolod Public Plaza, officially the Plaza del 6 de Noviembre, named after the day of the Spanish surrender of Negros Island to the Negros revolutionaries, is one of the notable landmarks of Bacolod, the capital of Negros Occidental, Philippines. The plaza is a trapezoidal park with a belt of trees  around the periphery and a gazebo at the center. Scattered within the trees are four circular fountains.

History

When Bacolod was declared as the capital of Negros Island in 1846, the Spanish Colonial Government in Negros set to work in creating a public plaza fronting the current Banco de Oro branch, which used to be the "Casa Real" or the official residence of the Spanish governor. However, the plaza was too small to be constituted that Don Jose Vicente Locsin Gonzaga donated a portion of his property to expand the plaza. These two lots continue to be owned by the City Government of Bacolod, while the other half was only added when the extension of Rizal Street towards San Juan Street cut off a portion of the churchyard of San Sebastian Cathedral.

His Excellency James McCloskey, Bishop of Jaro, which Bacolod previously belonged, in behalf of Monsignor Maurice Foley, the parish priest of Bacolod, granted a perpetual usufruct to the Municipal Government of Bacolod for the management of the property cut off from San Sebastian, on March 22, 1922. The gazebo/bandstand was constructed in 1926 and inaugurated in 1927, as part of the plaza's reorganization to its current form as a place for recreation, political, spiritual and cultural activities. The bandstand is inscribed along the sides of the roof with the names of Western classical music composers Beethoven, Wagner, Haydn, and Mozart.

Festival
The plaza is the heart of the MassKara Festival celebration. The MassKara Festival is a week-long celebration held each year in Bacolod every third weekend of October nearest October 19, the city's Charter Anniversary. The Bacolod public plaza is the final destination of MassKara street dancing competition which is the highlight of the celebration.

See also
 Negros Occidental Provincial Capitol
 Capitol Park and Lagoon
 Capitol Central
 Fountain of Justice

References

External links
MassKara Festival Page of the Bacolod City Official Website
MassKara Festival Photo Gallery of the Bacolod City Official Website
Lakbay Pilipinas: Masskara Festival

Plazas in the Philippines
Buildings and structures in Bacolod
Landmarks in the Philippines
Tourist attractions in Bacolod